Bardet–Biedl syndrome 9 is a protein that in humans is encoded by the BBS9 gene.

The expression of the Bardet–Biedl syndrome 9 protein is downregulated by parathyroid hormone in osteoblastic cells, and therefore, is thought to be involved in parathyroid hormone action in bones.

Mutations in this gene are associated with the Bardet–Biedl syndrome.

References

External links

Further reading

External links
 GeneReviews/NIH/NCBI/UW entry on Bardet–Biedl Syndrome